Kurla is a rural locality (a selo) in Khuninsky Selsoviet, Laksky District, Republic of Dagestan, Russia. The population was 79 as of 2010.

Geography 
Kurla is located 15 km northeast of Kumukh (the district's administrative centre) by road. Shuni and Turtsi are the nearest rural localities.

Nationalities 
Laks live there.

References 

Rural localities in Laksky District